The Blue Light is a black-and-white 1932 film  directed by Leni Riefenstahl and written by Béla Balázs with uncredited scripting by Carl Mayer. In Riefenstahl's film version, the witch, Junta, played by Riefenstahl, is intended to be a sympathetic character. Filming took place in the Brenta Dolomites, in Ticino, Switzerland, and Sarntal, South Tirol.

Plot
The Blue Light is a frame story with a fairy tale atmosphere and elements. A modern couple arrive in a convertible automobile at an inn in Santa Maria, a mountain village. Upon seeing an intriguing, cameo-style photo of a woman, they ask the innkeeper who she is. The innkeeper tells a young boy to bring in the book that contains "Junta's story," and the movie unfolds as the innkeeper opens a very large book to its title page.

Junta (Riefenstahl) is a young woman who lives, at the turn of the century, apart from her fellow villagers. Due to her feral strangeness, she is considered to be a witch. When she comes to town for one reason or another, the townsfolk chase her away. They feel that she must in some way be responsible for the ongoing deaths of the young men of the village. This is because Junta is able to climb the local mountain unscathed, while these young men continue to fall to their deaths attempting to climb it under supernatural circumstances.

Junta lives largely in solitude (except for the company of Guzzi, a young shepherd boy) in the tranquility of the mountains surrounding the village. She plays in the hills and woodlands, as a naive, free spirit. She is simple and innocent, but also seems something of a mystic. She loves to clamber over the steep, difficult terrain of the local mountains.

On full moon nights, a crack in a prominent local mountain admits the moon's light and illuminates a grotto filled with beautiful crystals. This place of indescribable beauty, radiating the film's titular "blaue Licht" (blue light), is a sacred space for Junta. The crystals' luminous glow casts a spell on the village's young men, who, one by one, in a state of hypnotic attraction, attempt and fail to reach its source, falling to their deaths.

Vigo, a painter from the city, travels to Santa Maria in a horse-drawn coach. Upon seeing Junta being harassed in the village square, he falls in love with her. Later, after saving her from the villagers after another young man's death, Vigo follows Junta to the cabin she shares with Guzzi, and decides to stay. Vigo speaks only German, and Junta only Italian, so their communication is limited. All is pleasant, good and very chaste until the next full moon night, when Vigo sees Junta climbing the mountain. He himself, mesmerized by the blue light, follows her, actually reaching the grotto, where he finds her in a state of ecstasy among the crystals.

Thinking he will help Junta by providing her with material wealth, and perceiving the lode of crystals to be a potential source of wealth for both her and the villagers, Vigo immediately rushes down to inform the townsfolk, also telling them how to safely reach the grotto. Junta does not realize that he is doing this until the next day, when she finds some of her crystals on the path to the village, along with some dropped tools. Rushing up to the grotto, she finds it completely barren of crystals: all have been taken by the greedy villagers. Meanwhile, the villagers and Vigo are celebrating. Junta is totally devastated at this violation of the sacred grotto and of her trust in the outsider, and falls to her death. Vigo finds her among the montane flowers (the mountain cornflower, or bluets), and grieves.

The film then closes, returning to the opening, modern-day scene, with a shot of what is presumably the last page of the book, in which Junta is exonerated and her memory celebrated.

Cast

Production background
In the 1993 documentary The Wonderful Horrible Life of Leni Riefenstahl (1993), Riefenstahl relates that the Agfa Film Corporation gave her a new film stock called R-Stock. When filming was done through a red filter the sky would appear absolutely black. The film was among the first sound films to be filmed entirely on location.

Arnold Fanck, who had directed several mountain films featuring Riefenstahl, did a first edit of the film, which Riefenstahl found unacceptable, and she completely re-edited the film. While the original edit needed work Riefenstahl's production of the film was ahead of her time. According to Reel Women: Pioneers of the Cinema, 1896 to the Present  Riefenstahl was questioned on her techniques such as combining different filters to create the famous blue light within the film.

Reception
The film was a moderate commercial and critical success. It performed well in much of Europe and the UK, although some critics were divided, particularly in Germany. Several left wing news publications derided the effort, while it was applauded by the right wing press. The film enjoyed considerable commercial and critical success in London and Paris, where Alpine cinema was a novelty. It was screened in competition at the 1932 Venice Film Festival. It was also named one of the year's top five foreign films at the 1934 National Board of Review Awards.

The New York Sun described the film as "one of the most pictorially beautiful films of the year. Leni Riefenstahl - author, director and star - is an expert climber as well as handsome woman."

The New York Herald Tribune praised the "sheer pictorial beauty", the publication also praised Riefenstahl remarking "how flawlessly this girl, who plays the lead and also wrote and directed, accomplished her task."

The New York Times remarked that "a summary of the story gives no adequate idea of the beauty of the action and the remarkable camera work, especially in connection with the light effects."

The film's aesthetic, particularly the depiction of nature, is also said to have caught the attention of Adolf Hitler, and possibly contributed to his later decision to commission Riefenstahl to make propaganda films for him.

Re-release
In 1937, a re-release of the film in Nazi Germany removed the names of Mayer, Balázs, and Sokal from the credits. This was due to the antisemitic policies of the regime, as all three were Jewish. It's often suggested that this was done by Riefenstahl's request.

An edited version of the film was released in 1951, funded by Italian corporations. Riefenstahl edited the film from 86 to 73 minutes, removing the arrival scene of modern urbanites in Santa Maria. The film was marketed with the credit "A Mountain Legend by Leni Riefenstahl". In November 1951, It premiered with a new edit, score and soundtrack in Rome at a gala screening that Riefenstahl described as "dazzling". The film was distributed in German cinemas and had a limited release in Austria under the title  The Witch of Santa Maria (Die Hexe von Santa Maria).

Proposed remake
In 1960, Riefenstahl collaborated with L. Ron Hubbard on a screenplay for a remake of The Blue Light but it was never produced.

Possible inspirations
A similarly named legend in Germany (Das blaue Licht) may have lent some inspiration to Riefenstahl's screenplay.  In a period of time when a pan-Germanic ethos was sweeping the country, audiences were highly likely to have been familiar with the old legend, and accordingly expected the film to follow it closely.  However, the film shares very little with the legend, and even departs from it in an unexpected way, casting Leni Riefenstahl as the beautiful loner, not at all a witch, but wrongly accused of being one.

The original legend, compiled by the Brothers Grimm in 1810, and later popularized by the pre-Hitler nationalists of the 1920s, tells the story of a crippled soldier who is terminated from the service of his king.  Released from service, he travels into the woods to seek a cure, and comes upon a witch's house.  It is there that he asks her if she is willing to help him.  She agrees to cure him but he must first do three things for her. (The third task being nothing less than to descend into a very deep and dry well, and bring back from its depths a magic lamp.)

In that legend, however, the soldier finds a dwarflike creature at the bottom of the well.  Apart from the strange lamp he comes upon, which glows in a mysteriously blue light (and which ultimately leads to the witch's ruin), there is very little else to connect Riefenstahl's concept to the German myth that came before her.

Gustav Renker's novel Bergkristall (1930) has many similarities to the plot of Das blaue Licht and may have been used by Balázs and Riefenstahl without attribution.

See also 
List of German films of 1919–1933

References

External links
 
 
 About the film and stillphotographs of The Blue Light by Walter Riml
 http://users.skynet.be/deneulin/DBL.html   article about Das blaue Licht

1932 films
1930s fantasy drama films
German fantasy drama films
Films of the Weimar Republic
German black-and-white films
1930s German-language films
Mountaineering films
Films directed by Leni Riefenstahl
Films set in the Alps
Films set in Austria
Films set in Italy
Films set in the 19th century
Films with screenplays by Carl Mayer
1932 drama films
Films shot in Italy
Films shot in Switzerland
1930s German films